SIFO may refer to:

Sifo, a Swedish company in the area of opinion and social research
National Institute for Consumer Research (SIFO), a consumer affairs research institute based in Oslo, Norway
Sifo Company of St. Paul, Minnesota, a defunct maker of children's toys